Concepción is a city and the department seat of Chicligasta in Tucumán Province, Argentina. It is located 76 km south of the provincial capital San Miguel de Tucumán and has a population of 49,782. Due to its population and bustling commercial activity, the city is considered to be the second most important urban area in the province (the first one being the Greater San Miguel de Tucumán region), and the main one in southern Tucumán.

Populated places in Tucumán Province
Populated places established in 1900
Cities in Argentina
Argentina
Tucumán Province